Events during the year 2019 in Italy.

Incumbents
 President: Sergio Mattarella
 Prime Minister: Giuseppe Conte

Events 

14–17 February – Scheduled date for the 2019 Italian Basketball Cup, to be played in Florence
1 March – 1 September – The 22nd Triennial is scheduled to be held in Milan
31 March – Several tens of thousands of people marched in support of the ultra-Conservative World Congress of Families on Sunday, on the final day of their conference in northern Italy.
24 June – The International Olympic Committee awards the 2026 Winter Olympics to Milan and Cortina d'Ampezzo, beating Stockholm-Åre.
24 July – New Mayor of Predappio announced plans to open Mussolini crypt to the public all year round. Mr Canali said he wanted to promote the tomb as a tourist attraction to boost the local economy.
9 August – The deputy prime minister and leader of the League Matteo Salvini called for new elections, and announced a no-confidence vote on the government backed by his party in a coalition with the Five Star Movement.
21 August – Prime Minister Giuseppe Conte resigns.
3 September – The Five Star Movement members voted in favor of a coalition with the Democrats, under the premiership of Conte.
4 September – The Conte II Cabinet was sworn in.
8 September – Charles Leclerc wins the Italian Grand Prix, marking Ferrari's winning return at Monza after nine years.
 19 September- an anti-piracy blitz occurs, most of the servers illegally broadcasting the signal of the main pay TVs in Italy, Belgium, France, the Netherlands and Spain.
27 October – The centre-right coalition composed of mr Salvini's League, far-right Brothers of Italy and Berlusconi's Forza Italia wins 2019 Umbrian regional election. becoming the first centre right government in Umbria in more than 50 years.
12 – 21 December – 2019 Winter Deaflympics held in Province of Sondrio for nine days.

Deaths

January

 2 January – Michele Caccavale, politician, Deputy (b. 1947).
 6 January – Angelo Ziccardi, politician, Senator (b. 1928).
 7 January – Alfredo Arpaia, politician, Deputy (b. 1940).
 9 January
Fernando Aiuti, immunologist and politician (b. 1935).
Paolo Paoloni, actor (b. 1929).
 10 January – Erminio Boso, politician, Senator (b. 1945).
 19 January – Mario Bertoncini, composer, pianist, and music educator (b. 1932).
 20 January – Evloghios, Orthodox bishop, Primate of the Holy Synod of Milan (b. 1935).
 21 January – Giuseppe Minardi, racing cyclist (b. 1928).
 25 January 
Vigilio Mario Olmi, Roman Catholic prelate, Auxiliary Bishop of Brescia 1986–2003 (b. 1927)
Renzo Pigni, politician (b. 1925).

February

 4 February – Giampiero Artegiani, Italian singer-songwriter, lyricist and producer (b. 1955)
 9 February – Mario Gerla, Italian computer scientist and engineer (b. 1943)
 10 February
 Mario Bernardo, Italian cinematographer (b. 1919)
 Maura Viceconte, Italian Olympic long-distance runner (b. 1967)
 13 February – Miranda Bonansea, Italian actress (b. 1926)
 15 February – Adriano Ossicini, Italian politician (b. 1920)
 19 February – Giulio Brogi, Italian actor (b. 1935)
 21 February – Maurizio Clerici, Italian Olympic rower (b. 1929)
 23 February – Marella Agnelli, Italian art collector and socialite (b. 1927)
 24 February – Giovanni Piana, Italian philosopher (b. 1940)

March
 9 March – Anna Costanza Baldry

April
 5 April – Gianfranco Leoncini, Italian footballer (b. 1939)
 19 April – Massimo Marino, television presenter and actor (b. 1960)

May
 11 May – Gianni De Michelis, Italian politician (b. 1940)

June

 5 June – Elio Sgreccia, Italian cardinal (b. 1928)
 7 June – Nello Governato, Italian footballer (b. 1938)
 8 June – Renzo Patria, Italian politician (b. 1933)
 10 June – Mario Mangiarotti, Italian fencer (b. 1920)
 11 June
 Domenico De Simone, Italian politician (b. 1926)
 Enrico Nascimbeni, Italian singer (b. 1959)
 Valeria Valeri, Italian actress (b. 1921)
 13 June – Rosario Parmegiani, Italian water polo player (b. 1937)
 15 June – Franco Zeffirelli, film director and politician (b. 1923)
 17 June
 Salvatore Senese, Italian politician (b. 1935)
 Remo Vigni, Italian footballer (b. 1938)
 20 June
 Emanuele Crestini, Italian politician (b. 1972)
 Gino Pasqualotto, Italian ice hockey player (b. 1955)
 25 June – Giuseppe Fabiani, Italian Roman Catholic bishop (b. 1926)
 26 June – Loredana Simioli, Italian actress (b. 1978)
 30 June – Giovanni Giavazzi, Italian politician (b. 1920)

July

 1 July
 Osvalda Giardi, Italian high jumper and pentathlete (b. 1932)
 Ennio Guarnieri, Italian cinematographer (b. 1930)
 2 July – Francesco Pontone, Italian politician (b. 1927)
 3 July – Vasco Tagliavini, Italian professional football player and coach (b. 1937)
 5 July
 Ugo Gregoretti, Italian film director, actor, screenwriter, author and television host (b. 1930
 Paolo Vinaccia, Italian composer, jazz drummer, and percussionist (b. 1954)
 7 July – Salvatore Angerami, Italian Roman Catholic prelate (b. 1956)
 9 July – Domenico Bova, Italian politician (b. 1946)
 10 July – Valentina Cortese, Italian actress (b. 1923).
 13 July
 Augusto Fantozzi, Italian lawyer and politician (b. 1940)
 Paolo Sardi, Italian cardinal (b. 1934)
 14 July – Nereo Laroni, Italian politician (b. 1942)
 17 July
 Andrea Camilleri, Italian writer (b. 1925)
 Giuseppe Merlo, Italian tennis player (b. 1927)
 18 July – Luciano De Crescenzo, Italian writer, film actor, director and engineer (b. 1928)
 20 July 
 Marisa Merz, Italian artist (b. 1926)
 Ilaria Occhini, Italian actress (b. 1934)
 22 July – Giuliana Morandini, Italian writer and literary critic (b. 1938)
 24 July – Sergio Di Giulio, Italian actor (b. 1945)

August
 16 August – Felice Gimondi, Italian racing cyclist (b. 1942)
 29 August – Achille Silvestrini, Italian cardinal (b. 1923)

September

 2 September – Andrea Gemma, Italian Roman Catholic prelate (b. 1930)
 7 September – Alberto Cerreti, Italian politician (b. 1939)
 10 September 
 Stefano Delle Chiaie, Italian neofascist activist (b. 1936)
 Salvatore Mannuzzu, Italian writer, politician, and magistrate (b. 1930)
 13 September – Bruno Grandi, Italian sports executive (b. 1934)
 15 September – Roberto Villetti, Italian politician (b. 1944)
 17 September – Fabio Buzzi, Italian motorboat builder and racer (b. 1943)
 19 September – Luigi Bommarito, Italian Roman Catholic archbishop (b. 1926)
 23 September – Walter Nicoletti, Italian football manager (b. 1952)
 27 September – Dante Bernini, Italian Roman Catholic prelate (b. 1922)

November
 22 November – Cecilia Seghizzi, composer, painter and teacher (b. 1908)

See also

 2019 European Parliament election
 2019 in Italian television

References 

 
2010s in Italy
Years of the 21st century in Italy
Italy
Italy